Doctors to Be: 20 Years On is a biographical documentary series first broadcast on BBC Four by the BBC in 2007. It is a sequel to the series about ten medical students Doctors to Be, and gives an update on the careers and lives of the same people after they had qualified.

Participants
 David Copping – He is a practicing GP.
 Mark George – He is a practicing colorectal surgeon and is married with children.
 Will Liddell – He is a GP, now semi-retired, who runs a farm and a campsite.
 Sarah Martindale – She spent several years in Australia and is a consultant anaesthetist.
 Jane Morris – She left medicine to raise her daughters and is now an agony aunt and healthcare advocate.
 Fey Probst – Now an A&E consultant, she is still practicing medicine and is a grandmother
 Ese Stacey – She is in private practice, primarily in sports medicine.
 Nick Hollings – He is a consultant Radiologist

References

External links
 

BBC television documentaries
2007 British television series debuts
2007 British television series endings
2000s British documentary television series
2000s British medical television series
English-language television shows